The Mojave Forks Dam, most often known as the Mojave River Dam, is an earth-fill dry dam across the Mojave River in San Bernardino County, California in the United States.

History
The Mojave River forks were first identified as a potential dam site in 1875, and flooding in the 1930s confirmed the need for a flood control facility along the Mojave River. However, it would be 30 more years before the state endorsed such a project. The West Fork Flood Control and Reservoir Project were authorized in 1960, and the USACE created a final design by 1966. Construction began in June 1967, and the embankment was topped out in May 1971. The project was formally completed and operational by 1974.

Federal engineers found in 2019 that the dam falls short of national safety standards and could erode and collapse in an extreme flood.

Dimensions and location
The main embankment, a rolled earthfill design, contains  of material. A smaller auxiliary dam is located directly to the west of the main dam, while the concrete spillway is on the east side of the dam.

The towns of Victorville, Hesperia and others in the Victor Valley region along the Mojave River, as well as towns further downstream such as Barstow, are the primary beneficiaries of the project.

Operations
Because the dam serves strictly for flood control, the reservoir is usually low or non-existent; however, it can fill quickly following heavy winter storms. Flood waters are released as quickly as possible without exceeding the capacity of downstream levees. Unlike most dams, the Mojave Dam outlet has no gates, meaning that the outflow is directly dependent on the water level behind the dam. All river flows below  pass unimpeded through the dam's outlets. The reservoir is generally drained within 2–3 days of a flooding event.

Because the dam reduces the sharp peaks of flash floods in the Mojave River channel, it also provides incidental groundwater recharge benefits in the Victor Valley area.

Recreation
Although there is no permanent pool at Mojave Forks, the dam and the surrounding area are part of Mojave River Forks Regional Park, which provides camping and hiking facilities. The Pacific Crest Trail also runs parallel the eastern end of the dam as it travels between the valleys of Deep Creek and the West Fork Mojave River.

See also
Cedar Springs Dam/Silverwood Lake
Los Angeles Flood of 1938
Mojave Narrows Park

References

Dams in California
Mojave River
Victor Valley
Buildings and structures in San Bernardino County, California
Earth-filled dams
Dams completed in 1971
1971 establishments in California
United States Army Corps of Engineers dams